European Democrat Students (EDS) is a pan-European centre-right student and youth political association, and the official student organisation of the European People's Party. Founded in Vienna by Scandinavian, German and Austrian students in 1961, it represents over 1,600,000 students and young people in 40 member organisations from 35 countries in Europe, and is the largest youth organisation in Europe.

Its stated goal is to promote a free, democratic and united Europe through a greater student mobility and comprehensive education policies across the continent. European Democrat Students has been always a frontrunner in integration, fighting for open borders, united Europe and European debate in European politics. The three pillars of EDS originally stood for conservatism, liberalism and Christian democracy. Today, EDS grew into a large family which has an outlook that is various, rich and unique, represented by the name 'Democrat'; here, student organisations, political youth organisations and other centre-right organisations come together to shape modern centre-right policies for Europe.

History

In 1958, a group of Swedish students, members of the Conservative Student League of Sweden, travelled to Vienna, Prague and West Berlin, where they attended the annual meeting of the Association of Christian Democratic Students. A cooperation between the Swedish and West German students was initiated, that was soon extended to include student organisations from the rest of Scandinavia and the United Kingdom.

In response to increasing activities of communist organisations, the liberal-conservative and christian democratic student organisations from these countries saw a need for stronger international cooperation among democratic student organisations in Europe. When the communist International Union of Students organised the "7th World Youth Festival" in Vienna in 1959, christian democratic and liberal-conservative students established the organisation Arbeitsgemeinschaft Neues Leben (Action Committee New Life), the first international organisation of centre-right students in Europe. The new organisation distributed pins with the text "Remember Hungary 1956!"

The Arbeitsgemeinschaft Neues Leben quickly evolved into the International Student Conferences, that took place in Copenhagen and Stockholm for the first time in 1960. At the third conference, in Vienna in 1961, the International of Christian-Democrat and Conservative Students, the predecessor of the European Democrat Students, was founded. The organisation considered itself to be the "first avantgarde fighter for the protection of the principles of liberty and individualism," and supported European integration and programmes for student mobility. The founding member organisations were the Freie Österreichische Studentenschaft (Austria), the Conservative Students (Denmark), the Association of Christian Democratic Students (West Germany), the Students' League of the Conservative Party (Norway), and the Confederation of Swedish Conservative and Liberal Students (FMSF). A few months later, the Federation of University Conservative and Unionist Associations (UK) and ESC (Belgium) joined.

The current name of the organisation, European Democrat Students, was adopted in 1975, after it was proposed by Carl Bildt.

Since 1997, EDS has been the official student organisation of the European People's Party (EPP). Full members status is held to the European Youth Forum (YFJ), the International Young Democrat Union (IYDU) and the Robert Schuman Institute. EDS is also recognised as a member association of the European Peoples Party (EPP), where EDS is one of the six EPP associations - in addition to recognition as an NGO at the Council of Europe.

Organising seminars, summer and winter universities, publications, campaigns and political resolutions, EDS connects like-minded students from all over the continent and shapes European student policies as well as the debates within the EPP. In 2011, the celebrations of the 50th anniversary have been conducted in Brussels and Vienna, attracting several hundreds of members, alumni, politicians and partners.

An important shift towards a more wide vision of the world was introduced during the working year 2017-2018 with the first Study Mission organized in Latin America under the title of "Caja Política". A second edition was held in 2019 in Guayaquil and Quito (Ecuador) and it successfully gathered young leaders from a dozen Latin American countries with representatives of the EDS Bureau and Member Organizations. After these events EDS became a pioneer in the center right becoming the first European organization regularly active in Latin America, Europe and Middle East.

Current Executive Burreau (21/22) http://www.edsnet.eu/executive-bureau/
Chairman Beppe Galea (Malta)

Sec gen  Ivan Boutocharov (United Kingdom)

Vice-chairs:

Ramon Riera (Spain)

Edvardas Lukosius (Lithuania)

Dora Hidas (Hungary)

Icovous Iacovou (Cyprus)

Rayno Stoyanov (Bulgaria)

Rodolfo Biancheri (Italy)

Kristjan Uhtid (Estonia)

Eleni Koufali (Greece)

Chairmen
 1962–1964: Carl-Henrik Winquist (Sweden) 
 1964–1966: Dieter Ibielski (Germany)
 1966–1968: Reginald E. Simmerson (UK) 
 1968–1970: Heikki S. von Hertzen (Finland)
 1970–1971: Ian Taylor (UK)
 1971–1972: Finn Braagaard (Denmark)
 1972–1974: Tom Spencer (UK)
 1974–1976: Carl Bildt (Sweden)
 1976–1978: Scott Hamilton (UK) 
 1978–1979: Pierre Moinet (France)
 1979–1981: Lars Eskeland (Norway)
 1981–1982: Per Heister (Sweden) 
 1982–1984: Knut Olav Nesse (Norway)
 1984–1985: Daniel Bischof (Switzerland)
 1985–1986: George Anagnostakos (Greece)
 1986–1988: Mattias Bengtsson (Sweden)
 1988–1989: Bettina Machaczek (Germany)
 1989–1991: Stavros Papastavrou (Greece)
 1991–1993: Laura de Esteban (Spain) 
 1993–1994: Tim Arnold (Germany)
 1994–1995: Fredrik Johansson (Sweden) 
 1995–1996: Andrew Reid (UK) 
 1996–1998: Günther Fehlinger (Austria)
 1998–1999: Michalis Peglis (Greece) 
 1999–2000: Ukko Metsola (Finland)
 2000–2001: Gustav Casparsson (Sweden) 
 2001–2003: Jacob Lund Nielsen (Denmark) 
 2003–2005: Alexandros Sinka (Cyprus) 
 2005–2006: Sven Henrik Häseker (Germany) 
 2006–2008: Ana Filipa Janine (Portugal)
 2008–2009: Thomas Uhlen (Germany)
 2009–2011: Bence Bauer (Hungary)
 2011–2013: Juraj Antal (Slovakia)
 2013–2015: Eva Majewski (Germany)
 2015–2017: Georgios Chatzigeorgiou (Cyprus)
 2017-2019: Virgilio Falco (Italy)
 2019-2021: Carlo Angrisano Girauta (Spain)
 Since 2021: Beppe Galea (Malta)

Members

EDS has four categories of membership: Full members, observers, and additionally affiliate and associate members.

The full members are (founding members in bold)
: AktionsGemeinschaft
 : Forumi Rinor i Partise Demokratike
: Etudiants Démocrates Humanistes
: Christen Democratische Studenten
: Youth Association of the Party of Democratic Action
: Federation of Independent Student Societies
: Млади Граждани за Европейско Развитие на България (МГЕРБ)
: University Organisation of the Croatian Peasant Party
: FPK Protoporia
: Conservative Students
: Union of Pro Patria and Res Publica Youth
: Student Union of National Coalition Party Tuhatkunta
: Union Nationale Inter-universitaire
: Young Student Organization Graali
: UYNM
: Ring Christlich-Demokratischer Studenten
: Dimokratiki Ananeotiki Protoporia – Nea Dimokratiki Foititiki Kinissi
: Fidelitas
: StudiCentro
: Nuovo Centrodestra
: Forumi Rinor i Lidhjes Demokratike te Kosoves
: Young Conservative League
: Youth Forces Union of VMRO-DPMNE
: Studenti Demokristjani Maltin
: Youth of the Liberal Democratic Party of Moldova
: Students' League of the Conservative Party
: Stowarzyszenie „Młodzi Demokraci”
: Liberal Student Clubs
: Hungarian Romanian Christian-Democrat Students of Romania
: Občiansko Demokratická Mládež
: Slovenian Academic Union
: New Generations of the People's Party of Spain
: Confederation of Swedish Conservative and Liberal Students
: Ukrainian Students Association
: Youth of Petro Poroshenko Bloc
: Young Conservative European Forum
: Youth for Innovation

The Affiliate Members are:
: Youth of the Republican Party of Armenia
: Lebanese Forces Students Association

The Observer Members are:

: Belarusian Student Network
: Tinerii Partidului Popular European din Moldova

The Associated Member is:
: Young Conservatives (Czech Republic)

Policies

In a 2009 resolution, the organisation expressed its support for the Prague Declaration on European Conscience and Communism, calling for the condemnation of communism, and adopted the declaration's content as part of its general policy. "Communism as a totalitarian regime [...] can only distinct itself from Fascism and Nazism by a more recent expiry date and the consequent damage over time it was able to cause," the resolution said.

BullsEye magazine

From 1977 to 1997 EDS had an official magazine under the name of Taurus. In the year 1997 the magazine was reshuffled and a new name was adopted. Since then it became The BullsEye magazine and every Council Meeting counted with an issue of the magazine, with an editorial team that enlarged year after year reaching in 2019 the largest number of applicants. The magazine currently covers the European political present, the EU Agenda 2019-2024 and key topics of the future of Education.

In the year 2019 it reached its 77th issue, published during the EPP Congress in Zagreb.

Literature 

 Holger Thuss and Bence Bauer, Students on the Right Way. European Democrat Students 1961-2011, Brussels 2012,

References

External links

 Official EDS website
The BullsEye Magazine

Democrat Students, European
Student political organizations
Student wings of political parties
International Young Democrat Union
Anti-communist organizations